Astro Base was a toy made by the Ideal company in the early 1960s. The toy ran on 4 D Cell batteries. Besides a power switch, it had several features that includes the following modes of operation:

Modes of operation
 Astro Scope: Switch to Astro Scope and a scene of spaceships, rockets, and jets rotates through a viewfinder just below a radar dome on the top of the toy. A button on the console let the user "fire" at objects seen on the screen, which would pause the rotating images and emit a machine-gun style sound.
 Space Lock: A crane emerges from the hatch on one side of the toy. This crane has a hoist operation that can be used to raise or lower a plastic astronaut figure, or other objects that the user may have that can be connected to the hook at the end of a chain. The main purpose of this crane is to insert or remove the astronaut from a scout car.
 Scout Car: The scout car can be plugged into a port on the console and controlled by a two position switch marked "turn" and "drive" that can actually be used to steer the vehicle with a bit of practice. The scout car also has missiles that can be launched.

Ideal made two variations of the Astro Base. The original "all red" version featured a lighted Astro Scope that illuminated the pictures spinning around the Astro Scope. Ideal Toys discontinued this version and offered the common "red and white" version.

References

External links
 Astro Base

1960s toys